Wafaa (وفاء) (also Wafa or Wava) is an Arabic personal name meaning "Loyalty, Faithfulness".

Plus the name may refer to :
Wafaa benraiss (born 2004), Moroccan.
Wafaa Ismail Baghdadi (born 1969), Egyptian athlete
Wafaa Bilal (born 1966), American artist
Wafaa El-Sadr (born 1950), Egyptian physician
Wafaa Lamrani (born 1960), Moroccan poet
Wafaa Sleiman (born 1952), Lebanese first lady
Wafa Sultan (born 1958), Syrian psychiatrist and author
Wafa Haider, lecturer and Pakistani poet.
Semiulla Wafin (Wafa), Finnish Tatar entrepreneur, cultural figure

See also
Wafaa Bloc
Wafaa A. Anani
wafaa benraiss
Persian feminine given names
Arabic feminine given names
Arabic unisex given names